The 2007 Nevada Wolf Pack football team represented the University of Nevada, Reno during the 2007 NCAA Division I FBS football season. Nevada competed as a member of the Western Athletic Conference (WAC). The Wolf Pack were led by Chris Ault in his 23rd overall and 4th straight season since taking over as head coach for the third time in 2004. They played their home games at Mackay Stadium.

Schedule

Game summaries

at Nebraska

at Northwestern

Nicholls State

UNLV

Fresno State

at Boise State

at Utah State

Idaho

at New Mexico State

Hawaii

at San Jose State

Louisiana Tech

at New Mexico

References

Nevada
Nevada Wolf Pack football seasons
Nevada Wolf Pack football